Conversations with Octavian Paler was published at Corinth Publishing House days after the passing of Octavian Paler by Daniel Cristea-Enache.

Summary
The book is a conversation between generations, from November, 2005, when Octavian Paler had just been awarded the Opera Omnia of the Writers Union, to April, 2007, the last recorded day being 29 April, just days before the writer's passing away. Writing to the proximity of death, Paler thought about the search for life's meaning and the maturity of old age, as in the statement: "Until old age we don’t have time to ask what is the meaning of life. We are too busy to live. At the old age we have time (even too much!) to do it, but then we face a painful discovery: life has meaning only if you’re not looking for it!"  But this statement does not fade his love for life itself: "To love too much life is equal to no longer stand it."

See also
 Octavian Paler
 List of Romanian writers

References

External links
 Convorbiri cu Octavian Paler

2007 books